Kirkwood is an unincorporated community in Crawford County, Kansas, United States.

History
Kirkwood had its start in about 1892 when Archie Kirkwood, a mining official, established a coal camp to which he added his name.

References

Further reading

External links
 Crawford County maps: Current, Historic, KDOT

Unincorporated communities in Crawford County, Kansas
Unincorporated communities in Kansas